The Estadio BR Julio Hernández Molina is a multi-use stadium located in Araure, Portuguesa, Venezuela. This stadium was inaugurated on October 25, 1967, and holds 11,000 people.

It is currently used mostly for baseball games, and previously served as the home stadium of the Llaneros de Acarigua, Llaneros de Portuguesa and Pastora de los Llanos former teams that played in the Venezuelan Professional Baseball League.

References

External links
es.Wikipedia.org – Estadio Bachiller Julio Hernández Molina
WorldStadiums.com

Baseball venues in Venezuela
Estadio BR Julio Hernandez Molina
Estadio BR Julio Hernandez Molina
Estadio BR Julio Hernandez Molina
Sports venues completed in 1965